William Trevor Cox  (24 May 1928 – 20 November 2016), known by his pen name William Trevor, was an Irish novelist, playwright, and short story writer. One of the elder statesmen of the Irish literary world, he is widely regarded as one of the greatest contemporary writers of short stories in the English language.

Trevor won the Whitbread Prize three times and was nominated five times for the Booker Prize, the last for his novel Love and Summer (2009), which was also shortlisted for the International Dublin Literary Award in 2011. His name was also mentioned in relation to the Nobel Prize in Literature. He won the 2008 International Nonino Prize in Italy. In 2014, Trevor was bestowed Saoi by the Aosdána.

Trevor resided in England from 1954 until his death at the age of 88.

Biography
Trevor was born as William Trevor Cox in Mitchelstown, County Cork, Ireland, to a middle-class, Anglo-Irish Protestant (Church of Ireland) family. He moved several times to other provincial towns, including Skibbereen, Tipperary, Youghal and Enniscorthy, as a result of his father's work as a bank official.

He was educated at St. Columba's College in Dublin, and at Trinity College Dublin, from which he received a degree in history. Trevor worked as a sculptor under the name Trevor Cox after his graduation from Trinity College, supplementing his income by teaching. He married Jane Ryan in 1952 and emigrated to Great Britain two years later, working as a copywriter for an advertising agency. It was during this time that he and his wife had their first son.

His first novel, A Standard of Behaviour, was published in 1958 (by Hutchinson of London), but received little critical success. He later disowned this work, and, according to his obituary in the Irish Times, "refused to have it republished".  It was in fact republished in 1982 and in 1989.

In 1964, at the age of 36, Trevor was awarded the Hawthornden Prize for Literature for The Old Boys. This success encouraged Trevor to become a full-time writer.

In 1971, he and his family moved from London to Devon in South West England, first to Dunkeswell, then in 1980 to Shobrooke, where he lived until his death. Despite having spent most of his life in England, he considered himself to be "Irish in every vein".

William Trevor died peacefully in his sleep on 20 November 2016. He was 88 years old.

Works and themes
He wrote several collections of short stories that were well received. His short stories often follow a Chekhovian pattern. The characters in Trevor's work are typically marginalized members of society: children, the elderly, single middle-aged men and women, or the unhappily married. Those who cannot accept the reality of their lives create their own alternative worlds into which they retreat. A number of the stories use Gothic elements to explore the nature of evil and its connection to madness. Trevor acknowledged the influence of James Joyce on his short-story writing, and "the odour of ashpits and old weeds and offal" can be detected in his work, but the overall impression is not of gloominess, since, particularly in his early work, the author's wry humour offers the reader a tragicomic version of the world. He  adapted much of his work for stage, television and radio. In 1990, Fools of Fortune was made into a film directed by Pat O'Connor, followed by a 1999 film adaptation of Felicia's Journey, which was directed by Atom Egoyan.

Trevor set his stories in both England and Ireland; they range from black comedies to tales based on Irish history and politics. A common theme is the tension between Protestant (usually Church of Ireland) landowners and Catholic tenants. His early books are peopled by eccentrics who speak in a pedantically formal manner and engage in hilariously comic activities that are recounted by a detached narrative voice. Instead of one central figure, the novels feature several protagonists of equal importance, drawn together by an institutional setting, which acts as a convergence point for their individual stories. The later novels are thematically and technically more complex. The operation of grace in the world is explored, and several narrative voices are used to view the same events from different angles. Unreliable narrators and different perspectives reflect the fragmentation and uncertainty of modern life. Trevor also explored the decaying institution of the "Big House" in his novels Fools of Fortune and The Story of Lucy Gault.

Awards and honours
Trevor was a member of the Irish Academy of Letters and Aosdána. He was awarded an honorary CBE in 1977 for "services to literature", and was made a Companion of Literature in 1994. In 2002 he received an honorary KBE in recognition of his services to literature.  He won the 2008 International Nonino Prize in Italy.

Trevor was nominated for the Booker Prize five times, making the shortlist in 1970, 1976, 1991 and 2002, and the longlist in 2009. He won the Whitbread Prize three times and the Hawthornden Prize for Literature once.

Since 2002, when non-American authors became eligible to compete for the O. Henry Award, Trevor won the award four times, for his stories Sacred Statues (2002), The Dressmaker's Child (2006), The Room (2007), a juror favourite of that year, and Folie à Deux (2008).

Trevor was shortlisted for the International Dublin Literary Award in 2011.

Recognition 
 1965: Hawthornden Prize for Literature for The Old Boys
 1970: Mrs. Eckdorf in O'Neill's Hotel was shortlisted for the Booker Prize
 1975: Royal Society of Literature for Angels at the Ritz and Other Stories
 1976: Whitbread Award for The Children of Dynmouth
 Allied Irish Banks Prize for fiction
 Heinemann Award for Fiction
 Shortlisted for the Booker Prize
 1980: Giles Cooper Award for Beyond the Pale
 1982: Giles Cooper Award for Autumn Sunshine
 1982: Jacob's Award for TV adaptation of The Ballroom of Romance
 1983: Whitbread Prize for Fools of Fortune 
 1991: Reading Turgenev was shortlisted for the Booker Prize
 1994: Whitbread Prize Best Novel for Felicia's Journey
 1999: David Cohen Prize by the Arts Council of England in recognition of his work.
 2001: Irish Literature Prize
 2002: Irish PEN Award The Man Booker Prize 1970
 2002: The Story of Lucy Gault was shortlisted for the Booker Prize and the Whitbread Award
 2003: Kerry Group Irish Fiction Award at the Listowel Writers' Week
 2008: Bob Hughes Lifetime Achievement Award in Irish Literature

Legacies
A monument to William Trevor was unveiled in Trevor's native Mitchelstown on 25 August 2004.  It is a bronze sculpture by Liam Lavery and Eithne Ring in the form of a lectern, with an open book incorporating an image of the writer and a quotation, as well as the titles of his three Whitbread Prize-winning works, and two others of significance.

On 23 May 2008, the eve of his 80th birthday, a commemorative plaque, indicating the house on Upper Cork Street, Mitchelstown where Trevor was born, was unveiled by Louis McRedmond.

Bibliography

Novels and novellas
 A Standard of Behaviour (Hutchinson, 1958)
 The Old Boys  (Bodley Head, 1964)
 The Boarding House (Bodley Head, 1965)
 The Love Department (Bodley Head, 1966)
 Mrs Eckdorf in O'Neill's Hotel (Bodley Head, 1969)
 Miss Gomez and the Brethren (Bodley Head, 1971)
 Elizabeth Alone (Bodley Head, 1973)
 The Children of Dynmouth  (Bodley Head, 1976)
 The Distant Past (Poolbeg Press, 1979)
 Other People's Worlds (Bodley Head, 1980)
 Fools of Fortune (Bodley Head, 1983)
 Nights at the Alexandra (Hutchinson, 1987)
 The Silence in the Garden (Bodley Head, 1988)
 Two Lives (the two novellas Reading Turgenev and My House in Umbria) (Viking Press, 1991)
 Felicia's Journey (Viking, 1994)
 Death in Summer (Viking, 1998)
 The Story of Lucy Gault (Viking, 2002)
 Love and Summer (Viking, 2009)
 The Dressmaker's Child (Penguin Books)

Short story collections
 The Day We Got Drunk on Cake and Other Stories (Bodley Head, 1967)
 The Ballroom of Romance and Other Stories (Bodley Head, 1972)
 The Last Lunch of the Season (Covent Garden Press, 1973)
 Angels at the Ritz and Other Stories (Bodley Head, 1975)
 Lovers of their Time (Bodley Head, 1978)
 Beyond the Pale (Bodley Head, 1981)
 The Stories of William Trevor (Penguin, 1983)
 The News from Ireland and Other Stories (Bodley Head, 1986)
 Family Sins and Other Stories (Bodley Head, 1989)
 Outside Ireland: Selected Stories (Viking, 1992)
 The Collected Stories (Viking, 1992; Penguin, 1993, 2003)
 After Rain (Viking, 1996)
 Cocktails at Doney's (Bloomsbury Classics, 1996)
 The Hill Bachelors (Viking, 2000) 
 A Bit On the Side (Viking, 2004) 
 Cheating at Canasta (Viking, 2007) 
 Bodily Secrets (Penguin Great Loves, 2007; new selection of stories from earlier collections) 
 The Collected Stories (Viking, 2009) .
 Selected Stories (Viking, 2010), listed as "the second volume of his collected stories" .
 Last Stories (Viking, 2018)

Short fiction

Drama
 Out of the Unknown: "Walk's End" (1966)
 Play for Today: O Fat White Woman (1971, adaptation from short story)
 The Old Boys (Davis-Poynter, 1971)
 A Night with Mrs da Tanka (Samuel French, 1972)
 Going Home (Samuel French, 1972)
 Marriages (Samuel French, 1973)
 The Ballroom of Romance (Pat O’Connor, 1982)
 Going Home (Samuel French, 1972)

Children's books
 Juliet's Story (The O'Brien Press, Dublin, 1991)
 Juliet's Story (Bodley Head, 1992)

Non-fiction
 A Writer's Ireland: Landscape in Literature (Thames & Hudson, 1984)
 Excursions in the Real World: memoirs (Hutchinson, 1993)

As editor
 The Oxford Book of Irish Short Stories (Oxford University Press, 1989)

See also
 List of winners and shortlisted authors of the Booker Prize for Fiction

References

Sources

External links
 William Trevor at The British Council
 William Trevor at Ireland Literature Guide
 William Trevor at Read Ireland
 William Trevor at The New Yorker
 Archival material at 
 

Interviews
 Interview with John Tusa, BBC Radio 2010
 Interview with Mark Lawson, BBC Radio 2009

1928 births
2016 deaths
Saoithe
Costa Book Award winners
David Cohen Prize recipients
Fellows of the Royal Society of Literature
Honorary Knights Commander of the Order of the British Empire
Irish Anglicans
Irish male short story writers
Jacob's Award winners
The New Yorker people
People educated at St Columba's College, Dublin
Alumni of Trinity College Dublin
People from Mitchelstown
Writers from Devon
20th-century Irish novelists
20th-century Irish male writers
Irish male novelists
Irish PEN Award for Literature winners
20th-century Irish short story writers
O. Henry Award winners
People from Mid Devon District